Hyunsoonleella jejuensis is a Gram-negative, aerobic, rod-shaped and non-motile bacterium from the genus of Hyunsoonleella which has been isolated from seawater from the coast of the Jeju Island.

References 

Flavobacteria
Bacteria described in 2010